I. Bernard Cohen (1 March 1914 – 20 June 2003) was the Victor S. Thomas Professor of the history of science at Harvard University and the author of many books on the history of science and, in particular, Isaac Newton and Benjamin Franklin. 

Cohen was a Harvard undergraduate ('37) and then a Harvard PhD student and protégé of George Sarton who was the founder of Isis and the History of Science Society. Cohen was the first American to receive a PhD in history of science and taught at Harvard from 1942 until his death. During his tenure, he developed Harvard's program in the history of science.  He succeeded Sarton as editor of Isis (1952–1958) and, later, served as president of the Society (1961–1962). Cohen was also a president of the International Union of the History and Philosophy of Science. 

Cohen was an internationally recognized Newton scholar; his interests were encyclopedic, ranging from science and public policy to the history of computers, with several decades as a special consultant for history of computing with IBM. Among his hundreds of publications were such major books as Franklin and Newton (1956), The Birth of a New Physics (1959), The Newtonian Revolution (1980), Revolution in Science (1985), Science and the Founding Fathers (1995), Howard Aiken: Portrait of a Computer Pioneer (1999), and his last book, The Triumph of Numbers (2005), not to mention two jointly authored contributions, the variorum edition and new English translation of Newton's Principia. 

Cohen's April 1955 interview with Albert Einstein was the last Einstein gave before his death, in that same month. It was published that July in Scientific American, which also published Cohen's 1984 essay on Florence Nightingale.

In 1974, he was awarded the Sarton Medal by the History of Science Society. He was a member of the American Academy of Arts and Sciences and the American Philosophical Society. Many consider Cohen's most important work to be his 1999 translation, with the late Anne Whitman, of Newton's Principia. This 974-page work took Cohen over 15 years to fully translate.

Cohen supervised the doctoral dissertations of Lorraine Daston, Judith Grabiner, Kenneth Manning, Uta Merzbach, and Joan L. Richards. Among Cohen's other students (and protégés) were the Islamic philosopher Seyyed Hosein Nasr; Tufts University professor George E. Smith; Bucknell University professor Martha Verbrugge; Allen G. Debus; and Jeremy Bernstein.

He died of a bone marrow disorder.

Publications
 1953 – Benjamin Franklin: His Contribution to the American Tradition
 1956 – Franklin and Newton: An Inquiry into Speculative Newtonian Experimental Science and Franklin's Work in Electricity as an Example thereof
 1960 – The Birth of a New Physics (LoC 60-5918, Science Study Series S10, Anchor Books, Doubleday)
 1971 – Introduction to Newton's Principia
 1981 – The Newtonian Revolution
 1981 – Studies on William Harvey
 1984 –  (alternative pagination depending on country of sale: 98–107)
 1985 – Revolution in Science
 1985 – Album of Science: From Leonardo to Lavoisier, 1450–1800
 1985 – The Birth of a New Physics
 1990 – Benjamin Franklin's Science
 1994 – Interactions: Some Contacts between the Natural Sciences and the Social Sciences
 1995 – Science and the Founding Fathers: Science in the Political Thought of Jefferson, Franklin, Adams, and Madison
 1996 – Newton: Texts Backgrounds Commentaries (Norton Critical Editions)
 1999 – Howard Aiken: Portrait of a Computer Pioneer (History of Computing)
 1999 – Makin’ Numbers: Howard Aiken and the Computer (co-Editor with Gregory Welch)
 1999 – The Principia: Mathematical Principles of Natural Philosophy (Translator)
 2000 – Isaac Newton's Natural Philosophy (Editor)
 2002 – The Cambridge Companion to Newton (Editor) (
 2005 – The Triumph of Numbers: How Counting Shaped Modern Life

References

External links

1914 births
2003 deaths
Harvard University alumni
Harvard University faculty
American historians of science
Newton scholars
Members of the American Philosophical Society